Linda Klimovičová (born 18 June 2004) is a Czech tennis player.

She has a career-high combined junior ranking of 31, achieved on 25 October 2021.

Klimovičová made her WTA Tour main-draw debut at the 2021 Prague Open, where she received a wildcard into the doubles tournament.

Junior career
Junior Grand Slam results - Singles:
 Australian Open: –
 French Open: 1R (2022)
 Wimbledon: SF (2022)
 US Open: 1R (2021)

Junior Grand Slam results - Doubles:
 Australian Open: –
 French Open: 2R (2022)
 Wimbledon: QF (2022)
 US Open: 2R (2021)

Performance timeline 

Only main-draw results in WTA Tour, Grand Slam tournaments, Fed Cup/Billie Jean King Cup and Olympic Games are included in win–loss records.

Doubles
Current after the 2023 Australian Open.

ITF Circuit finals

Singles: 2 (1 title, 1 runner–up)

Doubles: 3 (1 title, 2 runner–ups)

Junior finals

ITF Finals

Singles: 11 (3 titles, 8 runner-ups)

Doubles: 6 (2 titles, 4 runner-ups)

References

External links
 
 

2004 births
Living people
Czech female tennis players